was a Japanese novelist.

Born in Nakijin, Okinawa, he attended local elementary and middle schools, but continued his high school in Kumamoto, where he began writing novels and studied with Haruo Umezaki. He graduated from the School of English Literature, Literature Department of Tokyo Imperial University.

In 1940, he was conscripted and sent to Bougainville Island. Towards the end of the war, in May 1945, he surrendered to Australian forces and was sent to a POW camp.

After being released, he did not return to Okinawa (which at the time was occupied by the Americans), but went to Tokyo instead, where he wrote novels while working in the offices of Shin Nihon Bungakukai ("Society of the Literature of the New Japan"), a leftist writers' association. In 1950, he published Kiyama ittō-hei to senkyōshi ("Private Kiyama and the Missionary") in the magazine "Shin Nihon Bungaku" and established himself as a writer.

In 1953, he returned for a visit for the first time after the war to Okinawa, and started using Okinawan themes in his writings. For the novel Okinawashima which was published in installments in Shin Nihon Bungaku ("New Japanese Literature") in 1956 he was awarded the "Mainichi Publications Literary Award".

In 1957, with fellow writers Tatsukichi Nishino, Kim Tal-su and Sei Kubota, he started  the so-called Riarizumu Kenkyukai ("Realism Research Association"). After having some ideological disputes (among others about the Partial Nuclear Test Ban Treaty, he siding with the Japanese Communist Party views) with other executives of the Society at a conference in 1964, and after his relations soured with Teruo Takei, the de facto leader of the Society, and the people around him, he was expelled from the Society of the Literature of the New Japan.

When the Nippon minshushugi bungaku domei ("Japanese Democratic Literary Alliance") was established in 1965, he was named vice-chairman. In 1971, he was awarded the Takiji-Yuriko Award for Akemodoro.

He died of pneumonia in Musashino, Tokyo, on April 16, 2003.

Awards 
 Mainichi Shuppan Bungaku Sho for Okinawashima (1956)
 Takiji-Yuriko Award for Akemodoro (1971)

References 

1913 births
2003 deaths
Japanese communists
People from Okinawa Prefecture
Writers from Okinawa Prefecture
Deaths from pneumonia in Japan
20th-century Japanese novelists
Japanese military personnel of World War II
Japanese prisoners of war
World War II prisoners of war held by Australia